is a Prefectural Natural Park in central Chiba Prefecture, Japan. Established in 1966, the park spans the municipalities of Chōnan, Ichihara, and Nagara. Kasamori-dera is on the Bandō 33 Kannon pilgrimage route; its Kannon Hall is an Important Cultural Property dating to 1597 and related woodlands are a Natural Monument.

See also
 National Parks of Japan

References

External links
  Map of Kasamori Tsurumai Prefectural Natural Park

Parks and gardens in Chiba Prefecture
Protected areas established in 1966
1966 establishments in Japan